Critical Mass is the sixth album by British progressive metal band Threshold. It was recorded in early 2002 and released in September. It is also the last album to feature original bassist Jon Jeary, who left immediately after the release. He was replaced by Steve Anderson, who appears on the live album Critical Energy and subsequent albums.

Track listing

Notes
The song "Round and Round" contains a quote from The Hitch-Hiker's Guide to the Galaxy.
The song "New Beginning" contains a quote from the I Ching Hexagram 32.

Personnel
Andrew "Mac" McDermott – vocals
Johanne James – drums
Jon Jeary – bass
Karl Groom – guitar
Nick Midson – guitar
Richard West – keyboards

References

2002 albums
Threshold (band) albums
Inside Out Music albums
Albums produced by Karl Groom